Waste Management and Research is a peer-reviewed scientific journal covering the field of waste management.

Information
The editor-in-chief is P. Agamuthu (University of Malaya). It was established in 1983 and is published by SAGE Publications on behalf of the International Solid Waste Association.

Abstracting and indexing
The journal is abstracted and indexed in Scopus, and the Science Citation Index Expanded.

According to the Journal Citation Reports, its 2013 impact factor is 1.114, ranking it 32nd out of 44 journals in the category "Engineering, Environmental" and 151st out of 215 journals in the category "Environmental Sciences".

References

External links

Waste Collection NW6
Foreclosure Clean Outs

Monthly journals
Waste management journals
English-language journals
SAGE Publishing academic journals
Publications established in 1983